St Barnabas College is a secondary school in Johannesburg, South Africa. It was founded in 1963, and was the first school in South Africa to be open to all races.

References

External links
 

Schools in Johannesburg